Love at First Byte is a play-on-words of the phrase "love at first sight" and may refer to:

 Love at First Byte, 2000 book by Christine Harris

Television
 Love @ First Byte: The Secret Science of Online Dating, 2012 CNBC documentary

Episodes
 "Love at First Byte", The Facts of Life, 1984
 "Love at First Byte", Small Wonder, 1988
 "Love at First Byte", Hurricanes, 1994
 "Love at First Byte", Phineas and Ferb, 2013

See also
 Love at First Bite, 1979 film
 Love at First Bite (1950 film)